Olle Lind is a Swedish jazz trombonist. In the 1970s and 1980s Lind led such ensembles as Regionmusiken Gotland and Visby Big Band.

References

Swedish jazz musicians
Living people
Year of birth missing (living people)
Swedish jazz trombonists
Radiojazzgruppen members
Place of birth missing (living people)
20th-century Swedish male musicians